William Tester (born April 26, 1960, in Charleston, South Carolina) is an American short story writer and novelist. He was raised on a cattle ranch in Florida and is a graduate of Columbia University (B.A., 1984) and Syracuse University (M.F.A., 1995). He published the novel Darling in 1991 and the story collection Head in 2000. He is the recipient of a National Endowment for the Arts Fellowship and The Mary McCarthy Prize. His short fiction and memoir excerpts have appeared in Esquire, Bomb, Nerve, TriQuarterly, The Quarterly, The North American Review, Witness and other literary journals. He taught writing at Columbia University, the State University of New York and Virginia Commonwealth University. He married artist and architectural designer Josefa Mulaire in May 1992.

References
 , Head, Stories. "Out of His Skull", by Scott Bradfield, New York Times, November 12, 2000.
 , Head, Stories, by William Tester. Sarabande Books. Chapter One, "Wet".
 , Heart of the Animal, memoir, by William Tester. Bomb,  66, Winter 1999.
 "Faces to Watch: Books", by Kelli Pryor, Entertainment Weekly, January 31, 1992. Retrieved July 18, 2010.
 "Vows; Josefa Mulaire and William Tester", by Lois Smith Brady, New York Times, June 7, 1992.  Retrieved July 18, 2010.
 , Bookshop, by Joseph Berger, New York Times, February 24, 2008.
  National Endowment for the Arts Literature Fellows, p. 40
 , Cousins, fiction, by William Tester. Esquire (magazine), September 1, 1989.

20th-century American novelists
21st-century American novelists
American male novelists
Novelists from Florida
1960 births
Living people
People with bipolar disorder
American male short story writers
20th-century American short story writers
21st-century American short story writers
20th-century American male writers
21st-century American male writers